The 2020 Faun-Ardèche Classic was the 20th edition of the Classic Sud-Ardèche cycle race. It was held on 29 February 2020 as a category 1.Pro race on the 2020 UCI Europe Tour and UCI ProSeries. The race started and finished in Guilherand-Granges.

Teams
Twenty teams of up to seven riders started the race:

Result

References

2020 in French sport
2020 UCI Europe Tour
2020 UCI ProSeries
Classic Sud-Ardèche
February 2020 sports events in France